Cumbia con Soul (English: Cumbia with Soul) is the second studio album by Mexican-American cumbia group Cruz Martínez y Los Super Reyes. It was released on June 30, 2009 by Warner Music Latina.

Track listing

References 

2009 albums
Los Super Reyes albums
Albums produced by Cruz Martínez
Warner Music Latina albums
Spanish-language albums
Cumbia albums